Brayan Antonio Beckeles (born 28 November 1985) is a Honduran professional footballer who plays as a right-back for Liga Nacional club Olimpia.

Club career

Early life
Beckeles started his career at hometown club Vida for whom he would make his professional debut and whom he would captain. He then joined giants Olimpia in 2011.

Olimpia 
Beckeles made his official debut for the club on 27 July 2011 during the CONCACAF Champions League Preliminary Round against Santos Laguna in a 3–1 defeat where he scored the only goal for the club.

Nashville SC
On 4 December 2019, it was announced that Beckeles would join Nashville SC ahead of their inaugural MLS season in 2020.

International career
He made his debut for Honduras in a September 2010 friendly match against Canada. On 26 January 2013, Beckeles scored his first ever goal for the national team in his 11th game, playing at the semi-finals of the 2013 Copa Centroamericana versus Belize. The goal proved to be a crucial one, as Honduras won 1–0 to progress to the final. He has represented his country at the 2011 CONCACAF Gold Cup. On 7 June 2014, he was sent off for two bookable offences in a World Cup warm-up match against England in Miami.

International goals
Scores and results list Honduras' goal tally first.

Honours

Club
Necaxa
Ascenso MX: 2015–16
Copa MX: Clausura 2018
Supercopa MX: 2018

References

External links
 

1985 births
Living people
People from La Ceiba
Association football defenders
Garifuna people
Honduran footballers
Honduras international footballers
Honduran expatriate footballers
Honduran expatriate sportspeople in Mexico
2011 CONCACAF Gold Cup players
2013 Copa Centroamericana players
2013 CONCACAF Gold Cup players
2014 FIFA World Cup players
2015 CONCACAF Gold Cup players
2017 CONCACAF Gold Cup players
C.D. Olimpia players
C.D.S. Vida players
Boavista F.C. players
Club Necaxa footballers
Nashville SC players
Liga Nacional de Fútbol Profesional de Honduras players
Primeira Liga players
Liga MX players
Expatriate footballers in Iran
Expatriate footballers in Mexico
Expatriate footballers in Portugal
2019 CONCACAF Gold Cup players
Major League Soccer players